Crazy Affairs is a 1954 Italian comedy film directed by G. W. Pabst. In May 2016, it was shown as part of a retrospective of Pabst's films at the Filmarchiv Austria.

Cast
 Aldo Fabrizi as Gnauli
 Carla Del Poggio as Dalia Rossi
 Enrico Viarisio as Professor Ruiz
 Enzo Fiermonte as Paolo
 Rita Giannuzzi as Silvia
 Lianella Carell as Diomira Guidi
 Arturo Bragaglia as The fisherman as a Patient
 Oscar Andriani as The lunatic who writes a letter
 Marco Tulli as The Inventor as a patient
 Gianna Baragli as Madwoman playing canasta
 Nietta Zocchi as Madwoman playing canasta
 Lia Di Leo as The Nurse
 Walter Brandi as A doctor

References

External links

Cose da pazzi at Variety Distribution

1954 films
1954 comedy films
1950s Italian-language films
Italian comedy films
Italian black-and-white films
Films directed by G. W. Pabst
Films set in psychiatric hospitals
1950s Italian films